The Elgin Formation is a geological formation in Minnesota. It preserves fossils dating back to the Ordovician period.

See also

 List of fossiliferous stratigraphic units in Minnesota
 Paleontology in Minnesota

References
 

Ordovician Minnesota
Ordovician southern paleotropical deposits